("A spiritual song booklet"), sometimes called First Wittenberg Hymnal and  (Choir hymnal), was the first German hymnal for choir, published in Wittenberg in 1524 by Johann Walter who collaborated with Martin Luther. It contains 32 sacred songs, including 24 by Luther, in settings by Walter for three to five parts with the melody in the tenor. Luther wrote a preface for the part books. The collection has been called the root of all Protestant song music.

History 
Martin Luther used hymns in German to affirm his ideas of reformation and to have the congregation actively take part in church services.  was the third German hymnal, after the "", published in Nürnberg by Jobst Gutnecht, and the "Erfurt Enchiridion", published in Erfurt, both also dating from 1524.  was published in Wittenberg and is often referred to as the first Wittenberg hymnal. It came with a foreword by Martin Luther: 

The collection was the first German collection of hymns for choir and was published in Wittenberg in 1524 by Johann Walter, who collaborated with Luther. The hymnal comprised originally 32 songs, 24 of which were written by Luther, including "" and "". The settings are for three, four, and five parts (SATTB), with the melody in the tenor. Nine of the songs are psalms paraphrased in metric stanzas, such as "", a paraphrase of Psalm 130. The order of the songs does not seem to follow a plan, but groupings are apparent, such as Latin songs being placed at the end, preceded by five songs about the topics of the creed and the Trinity:
  (Luther)
  (Luther)
  (Speratus)
  (Speratus)
  (Speratus)

Luther continued to revise and enlarge the 1524 "Wittenberg hymnal", adding more songs, and it was reprinted in 1529, 1531, 1533, 1535, and 1543. This culminated in an edition titled Geystliche Lieder, prefaced by Luther and published by Valentin Babst in Leipzig in 1545 shortly before Luther's death.

Contemporaneous editions of hymnals for lay people followed the organization of Luther's choral "Wittenberg hymnal" rather closely. For example, the Wittenberg Enchiridion of 1526 (full title Enchyridion of Spiritual Songs and Psalms for the Laity, Improved with Many More than Previously). contained ten more songs, with seven of them placed at the end and two others following a song with the same melody. This edition was copied in hymnals in Zurich in 1528 and in Leipzig in 1530.  has been called the root of all Protestant song music ("Grundstock aller evangelischer Liedmusik").

Editions 

 Walter, Johann / Kade, Otto: Wittembergisch Geistlich Gesangbuch, von 1524; zu drei, vier und fünf Stimmen, Neue Partitur-Ausgabe nebst Klavierauszug / von Otto Kade, Berlin, 1878 (Digitalisat)

See also 

 Metrical psalter

Lutheran
First Lutheran hymnal
 Erfurt Enchiridion
 Swenske songer eller wisor 1536
 Thomissøn's hymnal

Anabaptist
 Ausbund

Anglican
Book of Common Prayer
Whole Book of Psalms

Presbyterian
Book of Common Order
Scottish Psalter

Reformed
Souterliedekens
Genevan Psalter

References

External links 

 
 Walter, Johann ¬: Geystliche gesangk Buchleyn stimmbuecher.digitale-sammlungen.de
 Luther’s Preface to the Wittenberg Hymnal gnesiolutheran.com
 Geystliche gesangk Buchleyn WorldCat

16th century in music
Lutheran hymnals
1524 books
16th-century Christian texts